Brian Atkinson (born 19 January 1971) is an English former footballer who played as a midfielder, either on the wing or as a central midfielder.

Atkinson began his career with Sunderland and played in the 1992 FA Cup Final. After 141 appearances he lost his first team place in 1996 and was loaned to Carlisle United. Later in the year he joined Darlington, where he remained until his retirement from professional football in 2002.

His 13-year playing career brought almost 400 league and cup appearances and 6 England caps at under-21 level. He made his debut coming on as a substitute for Mark Blake in a friendly against Wales on 5 December 1991 at Prenton Park. He was also part of the England under-21 team that won the 1991 Toulon Tournament, beating the hosts, France, 1–0 in the final.

Atkinson had a brief spell working for Darlington's Centre of Excellence before spending five seasons as assistant manager of Northern League Division One club Newton Aycliffe. He was appointed assistant manager at Spennymoor Town in February 2012, and took up the corresponding role at Darlington 1883 (now Darlington) three months later. Atkinson stepped up to take charge of first team affairs on 1 October 2017 following the resignation of manager Martin Gray. This role was short-lived, and in November 2017, he re-joined Gray at York City as matchday analyst.

Honours 
Sunderland
 Football League Second Division play-offs runner-up: 1990
 FA Cup runner-up: 1992
 Football League First Division winner: 1995–96

Darlington
 Football League Third Division play-offs runner-up: 2000

England U21
 Toulon Tournament: 1991

References

External links

Brian Atkinson at Footballdatabase

1971 births
Living people
Footballers from Darlington
English footballers
England under-21 international footballers
Association football midfielders
Sunderland A.F.C. players
Carlisle United F.C. players
Darlington F.C. players
English Football League players
York City F.C. non-playing staff
FA Cup Final players